Rubus rolfei, known as creeping raspberry, crinkle-leaf creeper, or Taiwanese creeping bramble, is a low-growing member of the genus Rubus and is related to the blackberry and raspberry. It is common in the horticultural trade. The species is originally from Taiwan where it grows at high elevations.

Description 
Like other plants in this genus, creeping raspberries bear aggregate fruits. Each "fruit" is actually a cluster of small fruit-like parts (pistils) connected together into one mass.  

Creeping raspberry fruits are similar in appearance to blackberries or red raspberries, but differ in that their color is yellow to orangish-red.  The edible fruits follow white flowers which are borne in early summer.

Uses 
Plants are sometimes used to form a low growing, non-invasive, semi-evergreen to evergreen ground cover. Cultivars such as 'Emerald Carpet' are common in the plant trade.

Taxonomy 
The names Rubus pentalobus, R. hayata-koidzumii and R. calycinoides are considered taxonomic synonyms of Rubus rolfei. Rubus calycinoides, as described by Otto Kuntze, is a distinct species.

References

External links
 

rolfei
Fruits originating in East Asia